Communist Party of Mexico (Marxist–Leninist), is an anti-revisionist Marxist-Leninist communist party in Mexico which upholds the line of Joseph Stalin and Enver Hoxha.

The party is an active member of the International Conference of Marxist-Leninist Parties and Organizations (Unity & Struggle). It publishes the newspaper Vanguardia Proletaria and the theoretical magazine Política.
This organization has been one of the most influential in the revolutionary left in Mexico, they have played an important part in the most significant social movements of recent years such as CGH (UNAM 1999), the Mexe Hidalgo (2000), Atenco (2003), Lazaro Cardenas (2006), Guerrero, the Commune of Oaxaca (APPO 2006).

External links 
 Official website
 Vanguardia Proletaria (archive)

Communist parties in Mexico
Anti-revisionist organizations
Stalinist parties
Far-left politics in Mexico
International Conference of Marxist–Leninist Parties and Organizations (Unity & Struggle)
Political parties in Mexico
Hoxhaist parties
Political parties with year of establishment missing